Voeltzkowia yamagishii is a species of lizard which is endemic to Madagascar.

Etymology
The specific name, yamagishii, is in honor of Japanese zoologist .

References

yamagishii
Reptiles of Madagascar
Endemic fauna of Madagascar
Reptiles described in 2003
Taxa named by Tsutomu Hikida